Richard Cromwell (born LeRoy Melvin Radabaugh; January 8, 1910 – October 11, 1960) also known as Roy Radabaugh, was an American actor. His career was at its pinnacle with his work in Jezebel (1938) with Bette Davis and Henry Fonda and again with Fonda in John Ford's Young Mr. Lincoln (1939). Cromwell's fame was perhaps first assured in The Lives of a Bengal Lancer (1935), sharing top billing with Gary Cooper and Franchot Tone.

That film was the first major effort directed by Henry Hathaway and it was based upon the popular novel by Francis Yeats-Brown. The Lives of a Bengal Lancer earned Paramount Studios a nomination for Best Picture in 1935, though Mutiny on the Bounty instead took the top award at the Academy Awards that year.

Leslie Halliwell in The Filmgoer's Companion, summed up Cromwell's enduring appeal when he described him as "a leading man, [the] gentle hero of early sound films."

Early life
Cromwell was born LeRoy Melvin Radabaugh in Long Beach, California, the second of five children, to his mother Fay B. (née Stocking) and his father, Ralph R. Radabaugh, who was an inventor. In 1918, when Radabaugh was still in grade school, his father died suddenly, one of the millions of people who perished during the "Spanish flu" pandemic. 

Radabaugh enrolled as a teenager in the Chouinard Art Institute in Los Angeles on a scholarship. He ran a shop in Hollywood where he sold pictures, made lampshades, and designed colour schemes for houses, including "decorating a bathroom for Colleen Moore and designing a house that he rented to Cole Porter."

Career

Radabaugh can be seen in King of Jazz (1930), along with the film's star, Paul Whiteman and his orchestra. On a whim, friends encouraged him to audition in 1930 for the remake of the Richard Barthelmess silent: Tol'able David (1930). Radabaugh won the role over thousands of hopefuls. In storybook fashion, Harry Cohn gave him his screen name and launched his career. Cromwell earned $75 per week for his work on Tol'able David. Noah Beery Sr. and John Carradine co-starred in the film. Later, Cohn signed Cromwell to a multi-year contract based on the strength of his performance and success in his first venture at the box-office. Amidst the flurry of publicity during this period, Cromwell toured the country, even meeting President Herbert Hoover in Washington, D.C.

Cromwell by then had maintained a deep friendship with Marie Dressler, which continued until her death from cancer in 1934. Dressler was nominated for a second Best Actress award for her 1932 portrayal of the title role in Emma. With that film, Dressler demonstrated her profound generosity to other performers: Dressler personally insisted that her studio bosses cast Cromwell on a loan-out in the lead opposite her. This was another break that helped sustain his rising status in Hollywood. Emma also starred Myrna Loy in one of her earlier screen performances. 

Cromwell's next role in 1932 was as Mike in Gregory La Cava's, The Age of Consent, co-starring Eric Linden and Dorothy Wilson. Cromwell is also remembered during this period in Hoop-La (1933), where he is seduced by Clara Bow.  Next, the much in demand Cromwell starred in Tom Brown of Culver.

Next up was an early standout performance by Cromwell as the leader of the youth gang in Cecil B. DeMille's now cult-favorite, This Day and Age (1933). To ensure that Cromwell's character used current slang, DeMille asked high school student Horace Hahn to read the script and comment. He starred with Jean Arthur in 1934, in "The Most Precious Thing in Life."

After a promising start, Cromwell's many early pictures at Columbia Pictures and elsewhere were mostly inconsequential. Cromwell starred with Will Rogers in Life Begins at 40 for Fox Film Corporation in 1935 and appeared in Poppy in 1936 as the suitor of W.C. Fields' daughter, Rochelle Hudson. In 1937, he portrayed the young bank-robber in love with Helen Mack and on the lam from Lionel Atwill in The Wrong Road.

Broadway and network radio

In 1936, Cromwell took a detour in his career to Broadway for the chance to star as an evil cadet in an original play by Joseph Viertel, So Proudly We Hail!. The military drama was directed by future film director Charles Walters, co-starred Edward Andrews and Eddie Bracken, and opened to much fanfare. The reviews of the play at the time called Cromwell's acting "a striking portrayal" (New York Herald Tribune) and his performance an "astonishing characterization" (New York World Telegram). The New York Times said that in the play, Cromwell "ran the gamut of emotions". However, the play closed after only 14 performances at the 46th Street Theater.

By now, Cromwell had shed his restrictive Columbia contract and pursued acting work as a freelancer in other media. On July 15, 1937, Cromwell guest-starred on The Royal Gelatin Hour hosted by Rudy Vallee, in a dramatic skit opposite Fay Wray. Enjoying the experience, Cromwell had his agent secure for him an audition for the role of Kit Marshall on the soap opera Those We Love, first on NBC Radio and then on CBS Radio. As a regular on the Monday night program which ran from 1938 until 1942, Cromwell played opposite Nan Grey; Grey played Kit's twin sister, Kathy.

Late 1930s

In the late 1930s, Cromwell appeared in Storm Over Bengal, for Republic Pictures, in order to capitalize on the success of The Lives of a Bengal Lancer. Aside from the aforementioned standout roles in Jezebel and The Lives of a Bengal Lancer, Cromwell did another notable turn as defendant Matt Clay to Henry Fonda's title-performance in Young Mr. Lincoln (1939).

In 1939, Cromwell again tried his luck on the stage in a regional production of Sutton Vane's play Outward Bound, featuring Dorothy Jordan as his co-star.

1940s and military service

In the early 1940s, Universal Pictures released Enemy Agent starring Cromwell as a draftsman who thwarts the Nazis. In 1942, he went on to appear in marginal but still watchable fare such as Baby Face Morgan, which co-starred Mary Carlisle.

Cromwell enjoyed a career boost, if not a critically acclaimed performance, in the film adaptation of the hit radio serial: Cosmo Jones, Crime Smasher (1943), opposite Gale Storm. Next up at Monogram Pictures, he was cast as a doctor working covertly for a police department to catch mobsters in the forgettable though endearing Riot Squad, wherein his "fiancée", Rita Quigley, breaks their engagement. 

Cromwell served during the last two years of World War II with the United States Coast Guard. Upon returning to California following the war's end, Cromwell acted in local theater productions. He also signed on for live performances in summer stock in the East during this period. Cromwell's break from films due to his stint in the Service meant that he was not much in demand after the War's end, and he retired from films after his comeback fizzled. His last role was in a noir flick of 1948, Bungalow 13. All told, Cromwell's film career spanned 39 films.

Personal life
Back in California for good, Cromwell was married once, briefly (1945–1946), to actress Angela Lansbury, when she was 19 and Cromwell was 35. Cromwell and Lansbury eloped and were married in a small civil ceremony on September 27, 1945, in Independence, California. In her authorized biography, Balancing Act, Lansbury recounts her life with Cromwell, as well as the couple's close friendship with Zachary Scott and his first wife, Elaine. Lansbury and Cromwell have stars within walking distance of each other on the Hollywood Walk of Fame. 

Cromwell made just one statement to the press regarding his wife of nine months and one of her habits: "All over the house, tea bags. In the middle of the night she'd get up and start drinking tea. It nearly drove me crazy."

According to the biography: Angela Lansbury, A Life on Stage and Screen, Lansbury stated in a 1966 interview that her first marriage, "was a mistake" and that she learned from it. She stated, "I wouldn't have not done it", and, "I was too young at 19. [The marriage] shouldn't have happened." Articles based on interviews with Lansbury have stated that Cromwell was gay. Cromwell and Lansbury remained friends until his death in 1960.

Death and legacy
In July 1960, Cromwell signed with producer Maury Dexter for 20th Century Fox's planned production of The Little Shepherd of Kingdom Come, co-starring Jimmie Rodgers, Bob Dix (son of Richard Dix), and Neil Hamilton who replaced Cromwell in the film. Cromwell became ill and died on October 11, 1960 in Hollywood of liver cancer, at the age of 50. He is interred at Fairhaven Memorial Park in Santa Ana, California.

Cromwell's legacy is preserved today by his nephew Dan Putnam, and his cousin Bill Keane IV, both of the Conejo Valley in Southern California, as well as the family of his late niece, Joan Radabaugh, of the Central Coast. In 2005, Keane donated materials relating to Cromwell's radio performances to the Thousand Oaks Library's Special Collection, "The American Radio Archive". In 2007, Keane donated memorabilia relating to Cromwell's film career and ceramics work to the AMPAS Margaret Herrick Library in Beverly Hills.

Cromwell was mentioned in Gore Vidal's satirical novel Myra Breckinridge (1968) as "the late Richard Cromwell, so satisfyingly tortured in Lives of a Bengal Lancer".

Selected filmography

Bibliography
 Blum, Daniel. Screen World, 1961, Chilton Company, Philadelphia, New York, 1961.
 Cary, Diana Serra. Jackie Coogan—The World's Boy King, Scarecrow Press, Lanham, Maryland, 2003.
 Crivello, Kirk. "Richard Cromwell--A Memoir and A Filmography", article in Filmograph, Vol. IV, No. 4, Orlean, Virginia, (likely mid-1970s).
 Edelman, Rob and Audrey Kupferberg. Angela Lansbury, A Life on Stage and Screen, Birch Lane Press, New York, 1996.
[Editors, various]. Cut! Hollywood Murders, Accidents and Other Tragedies, Barron's Press, Hauppauge, N.Y., 2006.
[Editors, various]. Picture Show Annual for 1932, Amalgamated Press LTD., The Fleetway House, London, 1932.
 Higham, Charles. Cecil B. DeMille: A Biography . . ., Charles Scribner's Sons, New York, 1973.
 Isherwood, Christopher. Lost Years, A Memoir 1945–1951, Vintage Books, Division of Random House, London (Copyright Don Bachardy), 2000.
 Lamparski, Richard. Hollywood Diary—Twelve Untold Tales . . ., BearManor Media, Albany, Georgia, 2006.
 Lee, Betty. Marie Dressler: The Unlikeliest Star, The University Press of Kentucky, Lexington, 1997.
 Morino, Marianne. The Hollywood Walk of Fame, Ten Speed Press, Berkeley, 1987.
 Palmer, Paul R. "Richard Cromwell", article in Film Fan Monthly, No. 167 (Leonard Maltin, Editor), Teaneck, New Jersey, May 1975.
 Vermilye, Jerry. The Films of the Thirties, Citadel Press, Secaucus, New Jersey, 1982.
 Vidal, Gore. Myra Breckinridge, Little, Brown, & Co., Boston, Toronto, 1968.

References

External links

Richard Cromwell at Virtual History
 N.Y.Times biography entry on Cromwell
https://www.youtube.com/watch?v=UR2jLotxoQA "Star Night at the Cocoanut Grove" aka "1930's Nightclub Views"

1910 births
1960 deaths
Male actors from Long Beach, California
American male film actors
United States Coast Guard personnel of World War II
American male radio actors
American male stage actors
Chouinard Art Institute alumni
Deaths from cancer in California
Deaths from liver cancer
20th-century American male actors
American gay actors
LGBT people from California
Lansbury family
20th-century American LGBT people